Malagum (Tyap: A̱zali, Uzali, Zali) is a village in Agworok chiefdom, Kaura Local Government Area in southern Kaduna state in the Middle Belt region of Nigeria. The village uses the post office in nearby Gworok town.

People and language

People

The people of Malagum surrounding areas are the Atyap proper and Agworok peoples.

Language

The people of Malagum speak two dialects of Tyap (Tyap proper and Gworok).

See also
 List of villages in Kaduna State

References

Populated places in Kaduna State